Norman Macleod Ferrers D.D. (11 August 1829 – 31 January 1903) was a British mathematician and university administrator and editor of a mathematical journal.

Career and research
Ferrers was educated at Eton College before studying at Gonville and Caius College, Cambridge, where he was Senior Wrangler in 1851.  He was appointed to a Fellowship at the college in 1852, was called to the bar in 1855 and was ordained deacon in 1859 and priest in 1860.  In 1880, he was appointed Master of the college, and served as vice-chancellor of Cambridge University from 1884 to 1885.

Ferrers made many contributions to mathematical literature. From 1855 to 1891 he worked with J. J. Sylvester as editors, with others, in publishing The Quarterly Journal of Pure and Applied Mathematics. Ferrers assembled the papers of George Green for publication in 1871.

In 1861 he published "An Elementary Treatise on Trilinear Co-ordinates". One of his early contributions was on Sylvester's development of Poinsot's representation of the motion of a rigid body about a fixed point.

In 1871 he first suggested to extend the equations of motion with nonholonomic constraints.
His another treatise on "Spherical Harmonics," published in 1877, presented many original features. 
In 1881 he studied Kelvin's investigation of the law of distribution of electricity in equilibrium on an uninfluenced spherical bowl 
and made the addition of finding the potential at any point of space in zonal harmonics.

He died at the College Lodge on 31 January 1903.

Integer partitions
Ferrers is associated with a particular way of arranging the partition of a natural number p. If p is the sum of n terms, the largest of which is m, then the Ferrers diagram starts with a row of m dots. The terms are arranged in order, and a row of dots corresponds to each term.

Adams, Ferrers, and Sylvester articulated this theorem of partitions: "The number of modes of partitioning (n) into (m) parts is equal to the number of modes of partitioning (n) into parts, one of which is always (m), and the others (m) or less than (m)." The proof, attributed to Ferrers by Sylvester in 1883, involves flipping a Ferrers diagram about a diagonal line.

In 1951 Jacques Riguet adopted this manner of ordering to the rows of a logical matrix. Alignment of rows of ones along the right side of a matrix is used, instead of the alignment of dots on the left. The logical matrix corresponds to a heterogeneous relation of Ferrers type.

Family
On 3 April 1866, he married Emily, daughter of John Lamb, dean of Bristol cathedral. 
They had four sons and one daughter.

Bibliography
 1861: An Elementary Treatise on Trilinear Coordinates (London), link from Internet Archive
 1871: Mathematical papers of the late George Green, Edited By N.M. Ferrers
 1877: An elementary treatise on spherical harmonics and subjects connected with them (London) from Internet Archive

References

External links

The National Archives | National Register of Archives | Person details | Archive Details at www.nra.nationalarchives.gov.uk
http://www.macleodgenealogy.org/ACMS/D0035/I2304.html

1829 births
1903 deaths
19th-century British mathematicians
Alumni of Gonville and Caius College, Cambridge
Combinatorialists
Fellows of Gonville and Caius College, Cambridge
Fellows of the Royal Society
Masters of Gonville and Caius College, Cambridge
People educated at Eton College
Senior Wranglers
19th-century English Anglican priests
Vice-Chancellors of the University of Cambridge